Quyllur (Quechua for star, hispanicized spelling Joyller) is a mountain in the Andes of Peru, about  high. It is located in the Lima Region, Oyón Province, Oyón District. Quyllur lies southwest of the mountain named Luliqucha.

References

Mountains of Peru
Mountains of Lima Region